Montenegrins in Bosnia and Herzegovina are an officially recognised national minority. The 1991 census counted 10,071 ethnic Montenegrins, while the 2013 census, counted some 7,150.

Demographics
1948 Census: 3,094 (0.1% of total population)
1953 Census: 7,336 (0.3% of total population)
1961 Census: 12,828 (0.4% of total population)
1971 Census: 13,021 (0.3% of total population)
1981 Census: 14,114 (0.3% of total population)
1991 Census: 10,071
2013 census: 7,150

References

 
Bosnians
Ethnic groups in Bosnia and Herzegovina